L'Homme de la Mancha is Jacques Brel's twelfth studio album. Released in 1968, it is the cast recording of the French adaptation of The Man of la Mancha by Mitch Leigh and Joe Darion. Brel adapted the book, translated the lyrics, directed the production, and played the role of Don Quixote. This was the only time he ever adapted songs by other writers or appeared in a stage musical. Joan Diener, who played Dulcinea in the original 1965 production, reprised the part in this production. The album was reissued on 23 September 2003 as part of the 16-CD box set Boîte à Bonbons by Barclay (980 817-5).

Track listing

Personnel 

 Jacques Brel – producer, translations, Don Quixote
 François Rauber – arrangements, orchestra conductor
 Mitch Leigh – composer
 Joe Darion – book and lyrics
 Joan Diener – Dulcinea
 Armand Mestral – The Innkeeper
 Constance Arnaud – The Housekeeper
 Marguerite Paquet – Antonia
 Jean-Claude Calon – Sancho Panza
 Louis Navarre – Padre
 Jacques Provin – Barber
 Manuela Miranda
 Janine Grenet
 Jean Mauvais
 Jean-Louis Tristan
 Suzanne Hennion
 Gérard Clavel
 Jean Salamero
 Michel Jarry
 Maxime Caza
 Luis Bernardo
 Luc Simon – set design
 Gerhard Lehner – audio engineer
 Jean-Marie Guérin – mastering
 Alain Marouani – photography

References 

Jacques Brel albums
1968 albums
Barclay (record label) albums
Universal Records albums
French-language albums
Albums conducted by François Rauber
Albums arranged by François Rauber